John Younker Simon (June 25, 1933 – July 8, 2008) was an American Civil War scholar known for editing the papers of Ulysses S. Grant.

Biography
Born in Highland Park, Illinois, to Jane Younker and Jay Simon, he was on the history faculty of Southern Illinois University Carbondale, for 44 years. Simon had MA and PhD history degrees from Harvard University. He received the Lincoln Prize Special Achievement Award in 2004 from the Civil War Institute at Gettysburg College for his then-24, later 31 volume Grant series. The same year, he also received The Lincoln Forum's Richard Nelson Current Award of Achievement.
He died July 8, 2008 in Carbondale, Illinois at the age of 75.

Quotes
"(He is) one of the finest people I've ever met." -- Geoffrey Perret, author of Ulysses S. Grant: Soldier & President

See also
 Bibliography of Ulysses S. Grant

References

External links

1933 births
2008 deaths
20th-century American historians
American male non-fiction writers
Harvard University alumni
Historians of the United States
Historians of the American Civil War
Ohio State University faculty
People from Carbondale, Illinois
People from Highland Park, Illinois
Historians from Illinois
Southern Illinois University Carbondale faculty
Swarthmore College alumni
Ulysses S. Grant
20th-century American male writers